Call Inlet is an inlet on the Central Coast region of British Columbia, Canada, located south of the lower reaches of Knight Inlet to the east of East Cracroft Island.  Pawala Indian Reserve No. 5 is at the head of the inlet.  Chatham Channel connects the outlet of the inlet to Knight Inlet and separates East Cracroft Island from the mainland peninsula on the north side of the inlet.  Havannah Channel leads southwest out of the inlet, south and east around East Cracroft and past Hull Island, to Johnstone Strait.

Name origin

References

Inlets of British Columbia
Central Coast of British Columbia